The 2022 Israel Super Cup was the 27th edition of the Israel Super Cup (32nd, including unofficial matches), an annual Israeli football match played between the winners of the previous season's Israeli Premier League (Maccabi Haifa) and the Israel State Cup (Hapoel Be'er Sheva). This will be the seventh edition since the Super cup's resumption in 2015.

Match details

References

2022–23 in Israeli football
Israel Super Cup
Israel Super Cup matches
Super Cup 2022
Super Cup 2022
Israel Super Cup
Israel Super Cup 2022